The Japan Curling Championships are the annual Japanese men's and women's curling championships, organized by the Japan Curling Association (JCA). The winners get to represent Japan at the men's and women's World Curling Championships and the next season's Pacific-Asia Curling Championships.

Summary

Qualification
The following teams have the right to participate to this championship.

 In 2019 (2018–2019 season)

 Last year's winners and runner-up teams.
 Teams represented Japan at 2018 Winter Olympics.
 Teams that won the regional championships (top 3 of Hokkaido, 1 of Tohoku, 1 of Kanto, 1 of Chubu and 1 of Western Japan).

 After 2020 (after 2019–2020 season)

 Last year's winners and runner-up teams.
 Top ranked teams in top 50 on WCT ranking at end of last October (without last year's winners and runner-up teams).
 Teams that won the regional championships (Hokkaido, Tohoku, Kanto, Chubu and Western Japan).
 Winners of wild-card games by runner-up teams in regional championships.

Format 
Round-robins by 9 teams and Page playoffs by qualified 4 teams.

Team names

In Japan, curling teams have historically used freely nicknames instead of the skip name. However, the  restricted the names that teams could use in the championship tournament in 2005, to one of the following: the skip's surname, organization name, association name, residential regional name, or the school name for the championships.

Championships

Results

Men

Women

References

External links 
 Japan Curling Association

See also
Japan Mixed Doubles Curling Championship

 
1984 establishments in Japan